Napoleon vs. The Evil Monarchies: The Battle of Austerlitz is a 1989 video game published by Cornerstone Software.

Gameplay
The Battle of Austerlitz is a game in which the 1805 battle of Napoleon I (France) vs. Tsar Alexander I (Russia) and Francis I (Austria) is simulated.

Reception
M. Evan Brooks reviewed the game for Computer Gaming World, and stated that "BOA is a Napoleonic simulation of introductory/medium complexity. Its mechanics are dated (and it shows) and it lacks a Napoleonic panache. Given the current state-of-the-art, BOA is not "art"! However, for the true Napoleonic buff, BOA may be of some entertainment value."

Reviews
Rating in Computer Gaming World #107

References

1989 video games
Amiga games
Battle of Austerlitz
Computer wargames
DOS games
Napoleonic Wars video games
Turn-based strategy video games
Video games developed in the United States
Video games set in Germany